Skittles may refer to:
 Skittles (confectionery), a brand of fruit-flavor chewy candy, distributed by Wm. Wrigley Jr. Company
Skittles Commercial: The Broadway Musical
 Skittles (sport), the game from which bowling originated
 Skittles (chess), a casual chess game in chess jargon
 Skittles, a carrom version that uses a spinning top to knock over pins
 Skittles, a slang term for Coricidin in recreational uses
 "Skittles", nickname of Catherine Walters, a famous Victorian courtesan